Rycerzewo may refer to:

Rycerzewo, Kuyavian-Pomeranian Voivodeship, a village in the Gmina Pakość, Inowrocław County, Poland
Rycerzewo, Warmian-Masurian Voivodeship, a settlement in the Gmina Miłakowo, Ostróda County, Poland

See also
Rycerzewko (disambiguation)

pl:Rycerzewo